

1800 Atlantic hurricane season
1) A minimal hurricane that passed through the Leeward Islands on August 10 moved through the Caribbean Sea and Gulf of Mexico to strike southeast Louisiana on August 18.

2) On August 27 and August 28, a hurricane struck Exuma in the Bahamas.

3) During September 9 and September 10 a hurricane impacted Bermuda.  The storm dismasted the brig Eliza sailing from Savannah to New York, causing the loss of two lives from those swept overboard.

4) Between October 2 and October 5, a hurricane lingered across South Carolina.  Twelve ships foundered at Charleston.  The cyclone spawned a tornado which moved across the northwest section of the city.  Its storm surge swept across much of Sullivan's Island. One died in Charleston.

5) The ship, Galgo, was sunk during a hurricane on October 9 over the southwest Atlantic. All 25 crew members were rescued.

6)  On October 31, a hurricane struck Jamaica before moving onward to Cuba and the southwest Atlantic. During November 4 and November 5, Bermuda experienced this hurricane.  A lighthouse begun in 1795 on Wreck Hill was abandoned after this storm, as it was then determined to be an unsuitable site (from Beware the Hurricane.)

1801 Atlantic hurricane season
1)  Nassau, Bahamas experienced a hurricane on July 22. 120 sails were wrecked onshore.  The system moved westward into the Gulf of Mexico.

2)  On August 15 and August 16, this hurricane made landfall near Mobile, Alabama.

1802 Atlantic hurricane season
1) A hurricane was spotted west of Jamaica between October 6 and October 10.
A hurricane was reported in Jackson, (Adams) New Hampshire. There were so many trees blown down, the town could not perform survey. Recorded in Vol 7 page 185 of NH legislature.

1803 Atlantic hurricane season
1) In August, a hurricane hit the West Indies. It continued through Jamaica, moved northward, and eventually hit England later in the month. It caused 121 deaths.

2) A hurricane hit near the Chesapeake Bay on August 29, causing at least one death.

3) The Carolina Hurricane of 1803 In addition, a minimal hurricane right on its heels hit near New Bern, North Carolina on August 31 and September 1. This type of tropical cyclone succession up the coast is similar to the Connie/Diane East coast landfalls of 1955.

4) The Norfolk Storm of 1803 During October 2 and October 3, a hurricane reportedly impacted Norfolk, Virginia.

1804 Atlantic hurricane season
1) During August 18 and August 19, a hurricane was noted east of Bermuda, sinking the ship Alexander.

2) On August 29, a violent hurricane was noted in Jamaica.

3) 1804 Antigua–Charleston hurricane, The Great Charleston Gale of 1804, or Hurricane Santa Rosalía of 1804

A hurricane was first spotted near the Leeward Islands on September 3. Most ships at harbor in St. Kitts, Antigua, St. Bartholomew, and Dominica were destroyed. Reported strongest hurricane to hit St. Kitts since 1772 one. It moved west-northwestward across western Puerto Rico and Turks Island on September 4. The storm turned northwest, negatively impacting September 6–7. It then moved northwest to hit Georgia as a major hurricane on September 7. It continued slowly through South Carolina and North Carolina, leaving the mainland on September 9 before striking New England on September 12. Reported strongest hurricane to hit Charleston since 1752 one. The hurricane caused 500 deaths. Damages to crops on St. Simons Island totaled $100,000 (1804 USD). Overall damages from Savannah totaled $500,000 (1804 USD), while Charleston incurred $1,000,000 in damages (1804 USD). Part of cluster of hurricanes struck Charleston area in 1804, 1811, 1813, 1820, and 1822.

4) Between September 22 and September 24, a tropical storm tracked from Cuba northward to South Carolina.

5) The Snow Hurricane of 1804

Later in the season, a major hurricane moved northwestward across the Western Atlantic to the north of Puerto Rico. It hit near Atlantic City, New Jersey on October 9, and turned northeastward. As it crossed New England, cool air was entrained in the circulation, and it became extratropical. The storm brought heavy snow across the Northeast, in some areas up to 2–3 feet, and killed 8 people. This was the first observation of snow from a landfalling hurricane, but not the last.

1805 Atlantic hurricane season
1) Between July 27 and August 1, a hurricane tracked through the southwest Atlantic east of Bermuda.

2) On September 30, a hurricane struck Mantanzas, Cuba then moved northward into Maine by October 3.

1806 Atlantic hurricane season
1) The Great Coastal Hurricane of 1806

A tropical cyclone was noted near the northeastern Lesser Antilles on August 17.  Moving west-northwest, the cyclone strengthened into a major hurricane. As it moved offshore Georgia, coastal flooding occurred on Jekyll Island on August 22. The schooner L. T. was wrecked offshore St. Mary's, Georgia. Charleston, South Carolina experienced heavy rains and high winds which uprooted trees. Georgetown, South Carolina's lighthouse was leveled during the storm. The hurricane hit the southern North Carolina coast on August 23 and led to 42 deaths. It moved out to sea, disrupting British and French ships involved in the Napoleonic Wars. After struggling against the storm offshore the Mid-Atlantic coastline, the Rose in Bloom capsized offshore New Jersey on August 24, with a loss of 23 passengers.

2) A tropical cyclone moved through the Mona Passage on August 26 before moving just offshore the East Coast of the United States through September 3.

3) A tropical storm caused damage in Vera Cruz, Mexico on September 8.

4) Hurricane San Vicente of 1806 A hurricane hit Dominica on September 11, resulting in 457 casualties.  The tropical cyclone subsequently moved through the Caribbean Sea and Gulf of Mexico, striking Mississippi by September 18.

5) On September 15, a hurricane hit northeast Florida, destroying several houses but leading to no deaths. On September 17, the hurricane hit New Orleans.

6) On September 20, another hurricane hit Dominica, causing an additional 165 deaths.

7) On September 28, a minimal hurricane hit the Outer Banks of North Carolina, destroying one ship.

8) During October 2, a tropical cyclone was witnessed at Jamaica. Moving northward, it struck South Carolina by October 9.

1807 Atlantic hurricane season
1) A tropical storm moved through the Lesser Antilles on July 25.

2) Hurricane San Jacinto of 1807 impacted Puerto Rico from August 17 to 19.  It was a slow moving hurricane, affecting the island for 50 hours.  The excessive rain caused all rivers to overflow causing great floods that destroyed crops.  Many lives and livestock were lost.  It crossed Puerto Rico from Humacao in the east to Aguadilla in the west and later continued to the Dominican Republic and Cuba.

3) On September 1, another tropical cyclone moved through the Lesser Antilles, striking Trinidad de Cuba on September 5.

4) Between October 16 and October 20, this hurricane moved from the extreme southeastern Caribbean Sea to the west of Jamaica.

1808 Atlantic hurricane season
1) A tropical cyclone struck Puerto Rico this year.

2) A minimal hurricane hit the Outer Banks on September 12, damaging the lighthouse there.

1809 Atlantic hurricane season
1) A tropical cyclone struck Dominica, Guadeloupe, Tortola, and Montserrat between August 1 and August 3, killing 62 people.

2) A tropical storm affected the northern Leeward Islands between October 9 and October 13.

See also

List of tropical cyclones
Atlantic hurricane season

References

External links
http://www.nhc.noaa.gov/pastdeadly.shtml
http://myweb.fsu.edu/jelsner/temp/HHITProject/HHITyears/
http://www.candoo.com/genresources/hurricane.htm

 
1800s
1800s natural disasters
1800s meteorology